Events during the year 1950 in  Northern Ireland.

Incumbents
 Governor - 	Earl Granville 
 Prime Minister - Basil Brooke

Events
12 March – Llandow air disaster: 83 people die when a plane carrying Welsh rugby fans home from Belfast crashes in South Wales.
12 May – Nationalist Senators and MPs in Northern Ireland ask the government of the Republic to give Northern-elected representatives seats in the Dáil and Seanad.
3 July – Ulster Transport Authority closes the Ballycastle Railway and the Ballymena and Larne Railway.

Arts and literature
 September - Poet Philip Larkin takes up a 5-year post as sub-librarian at Queen's University Belfast.

Sport

This was the only year where Ireland didn't participate at the Commonwealth Games. (British Empire Games)

Football
Irish League
Winners: Linfield

Irish Cup
Winners: Linfield 2 - 1 Distillery

Golf
British Ladies Amateur Golf Championship is held at Royal County Down Golf Club (winner:Vicomtesse de St Sauveur).

Births
22 January – Paul Bew, professor of Irish politics at Queen's University of Belfast.
16 February – Peter Hain, 16th Secretary of State for Northern Ireland.
12 April – Donal McKeown, Auxiliary Bishop in The Diocese of Down and Connor.
23 May – Martin McGuinness, Sinn Féin MP, MLA and Deputy First Minister (died 2017).
23 June – Martin O'Hagan, journalist (died 2001).
9 July – Alban Maginness, SDLP MLA.
12 August – Medbh McGuckian, poet.
28 September – Brian Keenan, writer and hostage in Lebanon.
Denis Donaldson, volunteer in the Provisional Irish Republican Army, member of Sinn Féin, exposed in 2005 as an informer (died 2006).

Deaths
20 July – Herbert Dixon, 1st Baron Glentoran, Unionist politician (born 1880).
James Sleator, painter (born 1889).

See also
1950 in Scotland
1950 in Wales

References